Pusté Úľany is a village and municipality in Galanta District of  the Trnava Region of south-west Slovakia.

History
In historical records the village was first mentioned in 1301.

Geography
The municipality lies at an elevation of 130 metres and covers an area of 24.540 km². It has a population of about 1,600 people.

References

External links
 
 
 http://www.statistics.sk/mosmis/eng/run.html
 https://web.archive.org/web/20090223191801/http://www.puste-ulany.sk/

Villages and municipalities in Galanta District